A lappet is a decorative flap, fold or hanging part of a headdress or garment. Lappets were a feature of women's headgear until the early twentieth century, and are still a feature of religious garments. Examples of lappets are to be found on the papal tiara and on the nemes headdress of the kings of ancient Egypt. The same term is also used for similar-looking anatomical features on some animals.

On women's headdresses 

Lappets were attached to some types of women's headdresses, notably the medieval hennin. They were also called cornet, although cornet sometimes referred to the hennin itself.

On episcopal mitres
 
The mitres worn by bishops and abbots of Western liturgical denominations, such as the Roman Catholic Church and the Church of England, have lappets attached to them. Mitre lappets are often lined with red silk.

The lappets are probably a vestige of the ancient Greek headband called a mitra (μίτρα), from which the mitre itself descends. The mitra was a band of cloth tied around the head, the ends of the remaining fabric of which would fall down the back of the neck. 

The Latin name for the lappets is infulae, which were originally headbands worn by dignitaries, priests, and others among the ancient Romans.  They were generally white.

In the Armenian Apostolic Church, the lappets are not attached directly to the mitre but are attached to the back of the cope.

On the papal tiara

Since early mediæval times each papal tiara has included two lappets. Their origins remain a mystery, though they are obviously an imitation of the lappets on the bishop's mitre. It has been speculated that lappets first were added to papal tiaras as a form of sweatband, with inner cloth being used to prevent popes from sweating too heavily during papal ceremonial in hot Roman summers.

The two lappets (literally "tails") at the back of the tiara are first seen in the pictures and sculpture in the thirteenth century, but were undoubtedly customary before this. They were black in color, as is evident both from the monumental remains and from the inventories, and this color was retained even into the fifteenth century.

Papal lappets on tiaras came to be highly decorated, with intricate stitching in gold thread. Often a pope who either commissioned a tiara, received it as a gift, or who had it remodelled for their usage, had their coat of arms stitched on to the lappets. Many later papal lappets were made of embroidered silk and used lace.

The last tiara to be used for a coronation, created for Pope Paul VI in 1963, also contained lappets.

On animals 
The word is also sometimes used to refer to wattles, flap-like structures that occur on the faces of some animals. For instance, the lappet-faced vulture has lappets of bare flesh on the sides of its head.

References

Headgear
Papal vestments
Scarves
Crowns (headgear)